Edward Lambert (born 1951) is an English composer.

Edward Lambert may also refer to:

Edward A. Lambert (1813–1885), Brooklyn mayor
Edward H. Lambert (1915–2003), Mayo Clinic electromyographer
Edward M. Lambert Jr. (born 1958), Massachusetts politician
Eddie J. Lambert, Louisiana politician